The Wangaratta Festival of Jazz is an annual Australian festival of jazz and blues, founded in 1990 by the City of Wangaratta with Adrian Jackson as its first director.

Since its inception the festival has grown to include 90 events and over 350 national and international artists performing each year. The Wangaratta Festival of Jazz also hosts the National Jazz Awards, Youth Jazz Workshops, master classes and events throughout Wangaratta and surrounding wine regions.

In 1999 the festival won a National Tourism Award and was inducted into the Victorian Tourism Hall of Fame. In 2000 the Wangaratta Festival of Jazz became a Victorian Hallmark Event.

History
The Wangaratta Festival of Jazz was conceived in 1989, when a group of local business people suggested the idea to the City of Wangaratta's Council. They funded a feasibility study which concluded that, although there were numerous music festivals in Australia, a point of difference could be achieved with one based on modern and contemporary jazz. It was recommended that such a festival be built around an international-standard jazz competition, initially for piano.

The first festival was staged on 2 to 4 November 1990. Adrian Jackson was its artistic director from 1990 to 2016. It was a much smaller event in its early years: attendances were around 2500 or so, and total box-office was around $25,000. But the event was regarded as a success, and was hailed in The Age and The Sydney Morning Herald (by Sydney jazz critic John Clare) as "the best festival of its kind ever held in Australia." Such feedback helped convince the Council that the event had a future and continued supporting it.

A feature of the festival is the National Jazz Awards, a competition designed to encourage and promote young musicians. It was initially ran as a piano competition for pianists (from 1990 to 1992), but this was changed to feature a different instrument each year. The inaugural winner of the piano competition, Barney McAll, received a prize of $5,000 and a return air fare to France to compete in the Paris Concours International Piano Competition.

The festival grew through the 1990s and stabilised in size and format through its second decade. In its first four years, it had one international guest; later several international bands or soloists are featured, often in collaborative projects with Australian artists. In its early years the festival was managed by a sub-committee organised and underwritten by the local council. In 1995 it was incorporated as a not-for-profit organisation, and has since been run as an independent body. The Rural City of Wangaratta remains a key stakeholder, as does the Victorian Government (which provides funding via Arts Victoria and Tourism Victoria), and the Australian Government via the Australia Council for the Arts. In 2000 Tourism Victoria recognised the festival as a Victorian Hallmark Event, for its cultural and economic significance to the Wangaratta region and Victoria.

In 2018 the Board of the Festival voted to put the Wangaratta Festival of Jazz & Blues on a year's hiatus. The reasons given were related to "the need to look strategically at the festival’s operating model, and its long-term sustainability."

The COVID-19 pandemic caused the festival to go virtual since 2020.

National Jazz Awards History 
In the Wangaratta Festival of Jazz' first year (1990), it was decided to feature an international-standard jazz piano competition, for musicians up to the age of 35. The format and rules were based on similar competitions in France (the Martial Solal Piano Competition) and the United States (the Thelonious Monk International Jazz Piano Competition). At that time each contestant provided an audio tape, "from which finalists will be selected. These will be short-listed for the play-off."

The inaugural winner was Barney McAll, with Jann Rutherford winning second prize and Scott Griffiths the third prize. In 1991, Mark Fitzgibbon won first prize, followed by Jann Rutherford and Cathy Harley. In 1992, Jann Rutherford succeeded on her third attempt; Cathy Harley was the runner-up, with Jeff Usher in third place. After that, it was decided to alter the format to feature saxophone, and from 1996, to rotate the featured instrument each year.

References

External links
 

Jazz festivals in Australia
Festivals in Victoria (Australia)
Recurring events established in 1990
Wangaratta